The Ambassador of Australia to the United Arab Emirates iis an officer of the Australian Department of Foreign Affairs and Trade and the head of the Embassy of the Commonwealth of Australia to the United Arab Emirates. The ambassador resides in Abu Dhabi. The current ambassador, since January 2020, is Heidi Venamore.

List of ambassadors

References

 
United Arab Emirates
Australia